The Pliska Rosette is a seven-pointed bronze rosette found in 1961 in Pliska, the medieval capital of Bulgaria. It is dated by archeologists to the 7th-9th century.

It is in the shape of a seven-pointed star and 38 mm in diameter. It is inscribed with Proto-Bulgar signs of the Murfatlar type. Each ray is inscribed with two signs and  an IYI symbol can be seen on the back.

Modern use
Representations of the medallion's design are often used (along with the symbol IYI and first letter from the glagolitic alphabet - ) by nationalist and patriotic movements in Bulgaria. It is also used as the logo of bTV's documentary series Bulgarite (Българите).

In Popular Culture
The Rosette features in the film In the Name of the King 3: The Last Mission by director Uwe Boll. It's tattooed on the arm of Hazen Kaine played by Dominic Purcell and has an important role in the plot of the film.

References 

 “The Bronze Rosette from Pliska: On Decoding the Runic Inscriptions in Bulgaria.” in Byzantino-Slavica. LVI (1995): 547-555  by  Pavel Georgiev
Juha Janhunen, Volker Rybatzki, "Writing in the Altaic world",  in: Proceedings of the 41st Annual Meeting of the Permanent International Altaistic Conference,  p. 270.

External links
 Ст. Ваклинов. – Формиране на старобългарската култура VI-XI век, София, 1977 г., стр. 154. (in Bulgarian)
  M. Sidorov, E. Kelevedzhiev. An approach to dating the Pliska rozette.

Medieval Bulgaria
Proto-Bulgar inscriptions
Pliska